Dahlia Adler is an American author of young adult and new adult fiction.

Personal life 
Dahlia Adler was born in New York City and raised in the suburbs. She is a graduate of New York University, with a BA in journalism. In addition to writing novels, she also runs the queer representation-focused blog LGBTQreads.com and was a blogger at the Barnes & Noble Teen blog from December 2013 until November 2019. As of January 2020, she is a contributor to Buzzfeed Books.

Selected works 
Adler's debut young adult novel, Behind the Scenes, about high school senior Ally who gets entangled in her celebrity best friend Vanessa's Hollywood life when she falls for her co-star, was published in 2014 by Spencer Hill. It has also been translated into Spanish and published by Ediciones Kiwi. A companion novel, Under the Lights, followed in 2015. In the companion novel Vanessa has to deal with a new co-star while Ally is off at college, and the former unexpectedly falls for the girl assigned by her publicist to handle her. Under the Lights was included on ALA's Rainbow Book List in 2016.

Adler wrote a three-book new adult series called Radleigh University. The third book, Out on Good Behavior, was a finalist for the 2016 Bisexual Book Awards in both Teen Literature and Romance.

In 2021, Adler published her first young adult novel in five years, Cool for the Summer, with Wednesday Books. It was an Indie Next pick, an Amazon Best Book of the Month, and Alma's choice for Best YA of 5781. Her next novel, Home Field Advantage, released on June 7, 2022, and was an Indie Next Pick and Amazon Best Book of the Month as well. Her next novel, Going Bicoastal, is slated to release in Summer 2023.

Adler is the editor of His Hideous Heart, an anthology of retellings of Edgar Allan Poe stories, featuring authors Kendare Blake, Rin Chupeco, Lamar Giles, Tessa Gratton, Tiffany D. Jackson, Stephanie Kuehn, Amanda Lovelace, Emily Lloyd-Jones, Hillary Monahan, Marieke Nijkamp, Caleb Roehrig, and Fran Wilde, which was published by Flatiron in 2019. It was named a Junior Library Guild selection and a Best YA of the Year by Publishers Weekly and Kirkus. In 2019, she announced her next anthology, That Way Madness Lies, a collection of reimaginings of Shakespeare's work, published in 2021.

She also contributed to three young adult anthologies out with Candlewick in 2018, Harlequin Teen in 2018, and Knopf in 2019.

Bibliography

Young Adult

Novels 
 Behind the Scenes (2014, Spencer Hill)
 Under the Lights (2015, Spencer Hill)
 Just Visiting (2015, Spencer Hill)
 Cool for the Summer (2021, Wednesday Books)
 Home Field Advantage (2022, Wednesday Books)
 Going Bicoastal (2023, Wednesday Books)
 My Name is Everett (2024, Wednesday Books)

Anthologies (contributor)

 "Daughter of the Book" in The Radical Element, edited by Jessica Spotswood (2018, Candlewick)
 "Molly's Lips" in All Out, edited by Saundra Mitchell (2018, Harlequin Teen)
 "Two Truths and an Oy" in It's a Whole Spiel, edited by Laura Silverman and Katherine Locke (2019, Knopf)
 "Lygia" in His Hideous Heart, edited by Dahlia Adler (2019, Flatiron Books)
 "I Bleed" in That Way Madness Lies, edited by Dahlia Adler (2021, Flatiron Books)
 "Say My Name" in At Midnight, edited by Dahlia Adler (2022, Flatiron Books)
 "Volley Girl" in Out of Our League, edited by Dahlia Adler and Jennifer Iacopelli (2024, Feiwel & Friends)

Editor 
 His Hideous Heart (2019, Flatiron Books)
That Way Madness Lies (2021, Flatiron Books)
At Midnight (2022, Flatiron Books)
Out of Our League (with Jennifer Iacopelli) (2024, Feiwel & Friends)

New Adult 
 Last Will and Testament (2014)
 Right of First Refusal (2016)
 Out on Good Behavior (2016)

Honors and awards 
2016: Bisexual Book Award in Teen Literature and Romance for Out on Good Behavior (nominated)
2019: Publishers Weekly Starred Review for His Hideous Heart
2021: Indie Next List (Cool for the Summer) 
2021: Alma Award for Best Jewish YA Novel of 5781 for Cool for the Summer 
2022: Publishers Weekly Starred Review for Home Field Advantage
2022: Indie Next List (Home Field Advantage) 
2022: Publishers Weekly Starred Review for At Midnight

References 

Living people
21st-century American novelists
American LGBT writers
Year of birth missing (living people)
New York University alumni
Writers from New York City
Novelists from New York (state)
American women novelists
21st-century American women writers
LGBT people from New York (state)
American writers of young adult literature
Women writers of young adult literature
21st-century American LGBT people